Gino James T. J. "Jack" Kelleher (born 22 September 1997) is an English footballer.

Career
Kelleher began his career playing in the youth teams at Everton and Stoke City before joining Morecambe in 2013. He gained experience out on loan at Kendal Town and made his professional debut on 24 October 2015 in a 1–0 defeat against Leyton Orient. He was released by Morecambe in May 2016.

References

External links

1997 births
Living people
English footballers
English Football League players
Everton F.C. players
Stoke City F.C. players
Morecambe F.C. players
Kendal Town F.C. players
Association football forwards